The Suicide Squad's roster has always been one of reformed and/or incarcerated felons promised commuted sentences in return for participation in high-risk missions. The Squad's lineup has changed many times over the years, since its creation in 1959, and this list groups membership by the team's various eras and incarnations. Bolded names indicate current Suicide Squad members.

First appearance is the issue where the character first appeared as a member of a particular Suicide Squad incarnation. It is not necessarily the first appearance of the character in print, nor the story depicting how the character joined the Squad. The Squad was made up by five members.

World War II Era
(Star Spangled War Stories #110-111)
Skipper Allan
The Professor

(Star Spangled War Stories #116-118, 120)
Vic Morgan
Andy (Barry) Mace
Baby Dino (first appears in #117)
Caveboy (first appears in #120)

(Star Spangled War Stories #119)
Wild One
The Sheriff

(Star Spangled War Stories #121)
Stoner
Manny

(Star Spangled War Stories #125)
Sgt. Trask
Reed
Mac the Second

(Star Spangled War Stories #127)
Woods
Hale
Green
Fitz
Kenny
Talbot
Peters
Kent
Frobish

(Star Spangled War Stories #128)
Arnie Brock
Tom Granger

The Silver Age Suicide Squad (1959–1987)

Suicide Squad (vol. 1) (1987–1992)

Interim Suicide Squads (1992–2001)

Suicide Squad (vol. 2) (2001–2002)

Interim Suicide Squads (2002–2008)

Suicide Squad (vol. 3) (2007–2008)

Interim Suicide Squads (2008–2011)

Suicide Squad (vol. 4) (2011–2014)

New Suicide Squad (2014–2016)

Suicide Squad (vol. 5) (2016–2019)

Suicide Squad (vol. 6) (2019–2020)

Suicide Squad (vol. 7) (2021–2022)

Suicide Squad Black/Limbo Legion 
Amanda Waller (De Facto Leader)
Chato Santana/El Diablo (Field Leader)
Enchantress
Gentleman Ghost
Juniper 
Klarion the Witch Boy
Snargoyle (deceased)
Wither
Aladdin
Alchemaster (deceased)
Doctor Thurmaturge
Etrigan
Azucar
Black Bison
Pigeon

First Suicide Squad

Rick Flag's Suicide Squad

Suicide Squad Dark/Task Force ✱

Task Force Z

In other media

Arrow (2014–2020) 
Two versions of the Suicide Squad appear the Arrowverse as listed below.

DC Extended Universe (2016–present)

DC Animated Movie Universe (2018–2020)

References

Suicide Squad members
Suicide Squad
Members